Johnson is an unincorporated community in Fayette County, in the U.S. state of Ohio.

History
An early variant name was Johnsons Crossing. The community was named for John Johnson, Sr., the original owner of the site. A general store was operated at the crossing.

References

Unincorporated communities in Fayette County, Ohio
Unincorporated communities in Ohio